The Sims 3 is a 2009 life simulation video game developed by the Redwood Shores studio of Maxis, and published by Electronic Arts. Part of The Sims series, it is the sequel to The Sims 2. It was released on June 2, 2009, for Mac OS X, Microsoft Windows and smartphone versions. Console versions were released for PlayStation 3, Xbox 360, and Nintendo DS in October 2010 and a month later for Wii. The Windows Phone version was released on October 15, 2010. A Nintendo 3DS version, released on March 27, 2011, was one of the platform's launch titles.

The game follows the same premises as its predecessors The Sims and The Sims 2 and is based around a life simulation where the player controls the actions and fates of its characters, the Sims, as well as their houses and neighbourhoods. The Sims 3 expands on previous games in having an open world system, where neighbourhoods are completely open for the sims to move around without any loading screens. A new design tool is introduced, the Create-a-Style tool, which allows every object, clothing and hair to be redesigned in any color, material or design pattern.

The Sims 3 was a commercial success, selling 1.4 million copies in its first week. It received mostly positive reviews from critics, with an 86/100 score from aggregator Metacritic indicating "generally favorable" reviews. The game has sold over ten million copies worldwide since its 2009 release, making it one of the best-selling PC games of all time. The Sims 3 has additionally received eleven expansion packs and nine "stuff packs". A sequel, The Sims 4, was released in September 2014 for PC; it received mixed reviews, largely due to the removal of the open world, Create-a-Style tool, and lack of content.

Gameplay 
As in previous games of the franchise, in The Sims 3 players control their own Sims' activities and relationships. The gameplay is open-ended and does not have a defined goal. The sims live in neighbourhoods, now being officially referred to as 'worlds', which can be customized, allowing the player to create their houses, community lots, and sims, although many of these come with the core game.

These worlds are now 'seamless', allowing all sims to move around freely without any loading screen in between lots, as happened in the previous games. Thus, the neighbourhood includes community lots which can be leisure lots (such as parks, gyms, and movie theatres) and job lots (town hall, hospital, businesses). Since the neighbourhood is open, the game includes the "Story Progression" mechanic, which allows all Sims in the neighborhood to autonomously continue their lives without the player ever controlling them. This helps to advance the story of the whole neighbourhood instead of only the active playing units. Sims live for a set duration of time that is adjustable by the player and advances through several life stages (baby, toddler, child, teen, young adult, adult, and elder). Sims can die of old age or they can die prematurely from causes such as fire, starvation, drowning, and electrocution.

The primary world in the game is Sunset Valley (in the console version, the main world is Moonlight Bay), while an additional world called Riverview can be obtained for free. All expansion packs to date (except Generations and Seasons) have included a world, and additional worlds can be bought at The Sims 3 Store for SimPoints. Additionally, Sunset Valley and a few of the other worlds available have some degree of connection to the storyline set up by The Sims and The Sims 2. In-game Sunset Valley is stated to be the same town as the default neighborhood in The Sims, and Pleasantview from The Sims 2, although set twenty five and fifty years earlier, respectively. Several pre-made characters from other Sims games appear throughout the Sims 3's worlds, many of them in younger form.

Career opportunities like working overtime or completing tasks can yield a pay raise, cash bonus, or relationship boost. Challenges occur randomly based on each Sim's lifestyle, like relationships, skills, and jobs.  Skill opportunities are the requests by your sim's neighbors or community members for Sims to solve problems using their acquired skills for cash or relationship rewards.

The new Wishes reward system replaces the Wants and Fears system in its predecessor The Sims 2. Fulfilling a Sim's wishes contributes to the Sim's Lifetime Happiness score, allowing players to purchase Lifetime Rewards for the cost of those Lifetime Happiness points.

The game introduces a big change in terms of customization with the "Create-a-Style" tool. In this way, every object or piece of clothing in the game is completely customizable in terms of color (which can be picked from a color wheel), material (plastic, stone, fabric, wood...) or design pattern.

Create-a-Sim 
The Sims 3 introduces many more character customization options than its predecessor The Sims 2. Like the previous game, the player can customize age, body build, skin color, hairstyles, clothing and personality. A new life stage is included between adolescence and adulthood: young adulthood. This stage was introduced in The Sims 2 only during university period, but is now the main life stage for the game. Additional options were added in expansions and updates, such as tattoos, breast size, and muscle definition. The Sims 3 offers a wider range of skin tones than its predecessors, ranging from realistic light and dark skin tones to fantasy green and purple colors.

The game builds upon a new personality system. As opposed to previous games, where personalities consisted on sliders, and a limited set of personality points to distribute among them, The Sims 3 introduces a trait system: adult sims can have up to 5 personality traits to pick from a list. These traits can be mental, physical, social or influenced by lifestyle and jobs. The traits will determine different actions the sims can make, as well as behaviors and wishes.

Skills 
The sims can learn skills from interacting with different objects. Skills improve gradually in 10 levels. Skill improvements are useful for achieving career goals, as well as unlocking new possibilities for those activities which require the skills, for example, a high gardening level allows the sims to plant different rare seeds. The basic skills include Logic, Cooking, Painting, Gardening, Writing, Guitar, Athletic, Handiness, Charisma and Fishing. New skills were later added in expansion packs.

Careers 
Many of the careers from The Sims 2 and The Sims are back in The Sims 3. The careers in the core game are Business, Culinary, Criminal, Education, Journalism, Law Enforcement, Medical, Military, Music, Political, Science, and Professional Sports, as well as part-time jobs in the book shop, supermarket or spa, which can be accomplished by both adults and teenagers. Each one of the jobs takes place in a community lot of the neighbourhood. However, these lots are only "rabbit-hole" buildings, with an external façade, but the player cannot access them and is not able to see what happens inside. Thus, jobs are automatic in the game, even if the player will sometimes receive challenges and questions with different options to have more control over the sims' career performance. Advancing in a career still depends on mood and skills, but with the addition that relationships with colleagues/boss and even certain goals that have to be fulfilled. Players can control if the sims "Work Hard", "Take It Easy", "Suck Up To Boss", etc., thus affecting their performance. A new feature The Sims 3 offers is branching careers, which allows Sims to choose a certain path in their career (such as a Sim in the Music career can eventually choose to specialize in Symphonic music or Rock). These branches are generally offered around level 6 of a career, depending on which career the Sim is working.

The Ambitions expansion pack includes brand new professions that are actually playable: Firefighter, Ghost Hunter, Investigator, Architectural Designer, and Stylist. Some of them take place in a playable community lot, such as Firefighter or Stylist, while the others are freelance jobs. Players can search for gigs in the neighbourhood and actually accomplish them. For example, an Architectural Designer can visit other sims' houses and redecorate them in exchange for money and career performance.

Sims are also able to make a living at home through their skills such as selling their own paintings, writing novels, playing guitar for tips, or growing fruit and vegetables. Sims can also buy out businesses and receive a percentage of the profits they earn.

Build/Buy modes 
As in previous games, a build/buy tool is included to design houses and community lots. The two modes retain most of the main fundamental tools from the previous games.

Build mode is used to add walls, paint them, add stairs, doors and windows, lay down flooring, create foundations, basements, pools and ponds. Some expansion packs add extra build mode features such as terrain design. Players cannot build or place objects outside the limits of the lot.

In Buy mode, the player can purchase and place down new objects, such as appliances, electronics, furniture and vehicles. Buy mode largely focuses on providing objects that are useful or necessary for the sims, allowing them to build skills, provide some sort of utility, or purely to act as house decoration. The descriptions of many of the objects available for purchase in the game involve humor, sarcasm, insults towards the player, and wit, and serves as comic relief in the game.

The build and buy modes have received their own makeover. The modes maintain the grid building system from the previous game, however, this grid is more flexible now, allowing the objects to be laid down in the middle of the tiles or without any grid help at all. A blueprint mode is added in further expansions, where pre-designed rooms are available to lay down as-is. The Create-a-Style tool can also be applied to redesign every single piece of furniture or building, changing to any color, material or design pattern.

Create-a-World 
On October 29, 2009, Electronic Arts announced "Create-a-World" (CAW), which is a game world editor that allows players to create their own custom cities from scratch for use within the game. Players can customize lots, choose terrain patterns and add roads, vegetation and neighborhood accents (such as water towers and lighthouses). CAW also allows players to import designs from PNG files for use in their worlds. Users can upload their worlds to The Sims 3 Exchange for download by other players. The editor tool is offered to players as a separate download, and was released on December 16, 2009, as a beta version. EA will offer technical support and updates. Players are able to share their neighborhoods as with other content. The Create-a-World tool is available for Windows-based PCs.

Family 
As this game is a life simulation, sims can have families. You can create a family in Create-a-Sim and edit their relationships, or you can manually meet different sims and have children.

Young adults and adults can try for a baby. There is no "Try for Baby" option for any younger or older sims. The only exception is senior males – they can try for a baby with a female of any age, though conception can be significantly harder. In order to try for a baby, two sims of the opposite gender must have a relationship of "Romantic Interest" or higher. A lullaby-like melody will play if the sim is pregnant, although sometimes it may not play.

Sims will get the Nauseous moodlet if they are pregnant, and these symptoms will persist for about 1 sim day until they discover they are pregnant and will change into default pregnancy clothes. From now on until after birth, the sim will not be able to wear their usual clothes. Some pregnancy symptoms sims can experience are: Nausea, backache, reduced or increased appetite and inability to partake in certain actions or exercise.

When the sim goes into labour, they can either deliver the baby at hospital or have a home birth. Most sims go to hospital by default, but this action can be cancelled. Kids and baby interior can be bought in buy mode. Babies require a lot of attention and care, and can get whisked away by social services if it is not given to them – along with toddlers, kids and teenagers. Babysitters can be hired to accompany children if their parents are busy.

Development 
Electronic Arts announced The Sims 3 on March 19, 2008. On January 15, 2009, Maxis invited "some of the best" custom content creators to their campus at Redwood Shores where they were hosting a Creator's Camp. Creators have been invited to spend the week exploring and creating content like Sims, houses and customized content. The Creators' work was used to pre-populate The Sims 3 Exchange.

On May 8, 2009, Maxis announced that The Sims 3 had gone gold meaning that the game had finished beta testing stage and was off for manufacturing ahead of its June 2009 release. On May 15, 2009, Maxis released several online interactive teaser experiences on The Sims 3 Website, including 'SimFriend', which allows users to choose a virtual Sim Friend who would email them throughout the day. 'SimSocial', which allows users to create their own Sim online, and have an adventure with them. 'SimSidekick', which allows users to surf the web with a sim. Two weeks before the game was scheduled to be released, an unauthorized copy of the digital distribution version of the game leaked onto the Internet. Maxis later commented the leak was a "buggy, pre-final" version. Maxis claims that more than half of the game is missing and is susceptible to crashes or worse. Reportedly, the title has seen higher copyright infringement rates than that of the most torrented game of 2008, Spore, also developed by Maxis.

Maxis relied on user feedback from previous games. In order to create the animations in the game, so they look believable but goofy, they shot real life references of people doing tasks in outrageous ways until satisfied with the outcome.

Each character in the game was specifically created by the developers to have their own life story, wishes, dreams, and personalities. The developers spend a lot of time trying to get the world to feel seamless and the characters to feel real.

Marketing 

On October 31, 2008, two teaser trailers were released by Electronic Arts featuring a comical view on the 2008 presidential election in the United States. Candidates John McCain and Barack Obama were included along with respective running mates Sarah Palin and Joe Biden.

In April 2009, Electronic Arts began to post billboards in many areas in advertisement for the game. Many of the billboards covered skyscrapers in densely populated areas, most notably Times Square in New York City. The costs of these billboards was estimated to be $10 million a month.

On March 23, 2009, The Sims 3 was threaded throughout the storyline of an episode of One Tree Hill.

On April 19, 2009, Target released a promotional disc of The Sims 3 that features a Ladytron band poster, The Sims 3 theme song music download, and a $5 off coupon. The main menu includes screensaver downloads, videos, Create-a-Sim, Create-A-House, and much more. There is no actual gameplay involved, but it describes what playing feels like.

On July 14, 2010, Ford began a promotion at The Sims 3 Store by allowing players to download their newest car at the time, the Ford Fiesta Mark VII. The car also came with a collection of street signs. On October 27, 2010, the download was updated to include the Fiesta Hatchback. The 2012 Ford Focus was made available to download on June 8, 2011. The car included one male Ford T-shirt, one female Ford T-shirt, a stereo, and a set of neon lights, all for use in-game. The Focus pack was available to download on Mac, PC, Xbox, and PlayStation platforms.

In 2012, EA partnered with American singer Katy Perry to promote The Sims 3. As part of the promotion, a special Katy Perry Collector's Edition of the Showtime expansion pack was released, as well as a Katy Perry's Sweet Treats stuff pack. Both packs incorporate concept elements from Perry's third studio album Teenage Dream (2010), with the latter including a Simlish rendition of the album's fifth single, "Last Friday Night (T.G.I.F.)", in the in-game radio.

Audio 
Music for The Sims 3 was composed by Steve Jablonsky. Scores were recorded with the Hollywood Studio Symphony at Newman Scoring Stage at 20th Century Fox. Music for the game's stereo and guitar objects was produced by others, including Ladytron, Darrell Brown, Rebeca Mauleon, and Peppino D'Agostino. Additional music was produced by APM Music. Two soundtracks have been released for The Sims 3 base game, The Sims 3 Soundtrack and The Sims 3 – Stereo Jams. The soundtrack includes theme music and the Stereo Jams album includes music from stereos in game. All songs on Stereo Jams are in Simlish.

Several musical artists partnered with EA to perform some of their songs in the language of Sims, Simlish. Artists have ranged from Katy Perry, Lady Antebellum, Flaming Lips, Damien Marley, Depeche Mode, Nelly Furtado, and Flo Rida.

Release 
On February 3, 2009, it was announced that the release date of The Sims 3 would be delayed from February 20, 2009, to June 2, 2009, in the US, and June 5, 2009, in the UK.

EA Singapore launched The Sims 3 with a large launch party which was held on June 2, 2009, at the Bugis+ shopping mall in Singapore. At the event, The Sims 3 T-shirts were available for purchase. In Sydney, Australia on June 4, 2009, a fashion event to show off the freedom and self-expression in The Sims 3 was held by Electronic Arts Australia, and included a performance by Jessica Mauboy.

The game was released as both a standard edition and a Collector's Edition. Both the Collector's Edition and the standard edition of the game comes with a coupon for 1000 Sim Points to spend at The Sims 3 Store. The standard edition contains the first release of the core game, while the Collector's Edition includes the Sims 3 core game, a 2 GB The Sims Plumbob USB flash drive (preloaded with wallpapers and screensavers of the game, and the main theme as an MP3 file) with matching Green Carabiner, an exclusive European-styled Sports Car download, a Prima Tips and Hints Guide (not the actual Sims 3 Prima Guide), and Plumbob stickers. Those that pre-ordered the game also got a Vintage Sports Car download, The Sims 3 Neighborhood Poster, and a quick start reference guide. A preview CD with more information about The Sims 3, such as music samples, family descriptions, and career information, was also released.

When the game was released on June 2, 2009, it featured both versions for Microsoft Windows and Mac OS X on the same disc, unlike the previous games in The Sims series, which were ported to Mac by Aspyr and released several months later after the initial release date. The Mac version was created with the help of Transgaming, Inc., who licensed Cider to developers in order to make their games Mac compatible by emulating Windows APIs. However, playing the game on Mac often results in poorer performance than in Windows, especially on higher-end systems. As it is a 32-bit application, it is not compatible with macOS Catalina or later. On October 2, 2019, Maxis announced that they would release an updated 64-bit version of the game, titled The Sims 3 (64-Bit & Metal), with compatibility for Mac OS X Catalina or later. Players who register the game on Origin would get the new version for free. The Sims 3 (64-Bit & Metal) was released on October 28, 2020.

Ports

Smartphone 

A now discontinued version of The Sims 3 was released on iOS, Android, Bada, Symbian, BlackBerry OS and Windows Phone on June 2, 2009. The iPhone game works similar to that of the PC version. In Create-a-Sim, instead of Lifetime Wishes, there are personas. Personas decide which lifetime wishes your sim will have, as a persona is the largest factor in a Sim's personality. Sims start out with a small house. The house can be expanded every five sim days if the player can afford it. There are four careers in the town: biology, politics, business, and culinary. As in the PC version, Sims can also learn skills. There are nearly 75 wishes in the game. When all of them are fulfilled, Sims unlock the criminal career and have the ability to purchase a car. In some events, such as appliances breaking down, the player must play a minigame to solve or do the action. The game was updated on November 30, 2010, to add support for the Retina display of newer devices.

A standalone expansion pack for the iOS version, World Adventures, was released on April 2, 2010. World Adventures adds tombs, new challenges, personas, and careers, new places to explore (Egypt, China and France), clothes and new furniture. A second standalone expansion pack, Ambitions, was released on September 16, 2010. Ambitions added new skills (firefighting, painting, parenting and sports), new community buildings, and the ability to have children. On November 6, 2009, EA announced the release of a vampire theme pack for the iPhone. The pack included Live it or Wear it Sets with Vampires and Werewolves, Castle and Campus Life themes. "Live it" sets contain car, furniture, decoration, wallpaper, and flooring. "Wear it" sets contain clothing, new CAS options, and hair styles.

Console 
The Sims 3 was released to game consoles on October 26, 2010, for PlayStation 3, Xbox 360, and Nintendo DS. It was later released for Wii on November 15, 2010 and Nintendo 3DS on March 25, 2011.

The game allows the player to take on up to three friends in the Life Moments Game on the Wii, upload and download content on Xbox Live and PlayStation Network, including furnishings, houses, and player creations or experience a full life simulation on a handheld with Nintendo DS. Reviews for the game ranged from average to moderately positive. Sims can age and die, but life cycles can be disabled optionally as well. The Sims 3 features a new Karma system (similar to the influence system in The Sims 2). Sims can interact with child Sims around the neighborhood, or have children of their own. Unlike the PC version of the game, the console versions have loading times when moving from one area to another, and when accessing build/buy modes.

The PlayStation 3 and Xbox 360 versions received mostly positive reviews. On Metacritic, it holds an average score of 77 and 76 out of 100 on the PS3 and Xbox 360 versions, respectively. Game Informer gave the 360 and PS3 versions a 9/10, praising the new Karma system and The Exchange. GameSpot gave the game a 7/10, noting that "the game lacks fluidity, but is fun in its own right." In a positive review, IGN praised the game for its controls on consoles, but said they were disappointed by the fact that there is only one town in the game, as well as bugs, including a glitch where the game will not save once a certain week has been reached. The Wii version received mixed reviews and was criticized by reviewers and players for poor performance and glitches, due to the weaker Wii hardware.

Expansions, add-ons, and editions

Expansion packs

Stuff packs 
Stuff packs only include new items e.g. furniture, clothing, hairstyles. They do not add any new functionality to the game. Stuff packs are compatible with both Windows and Mac OS X as with the main game and expansion packs.

Editions

Reception 

EA reported that in its first week, The Sims 3 sold 1.4 million copies. According to EA, this was the most successful PC game launch the company had had to date. According to retail data trackers Gfk Australia, The Sims 3 has been the top selling game in Australia from release until June 30, 2009. Response from critics and gamers alike were generally favorable, with Metacritic calculating a score of 86/100 based on 75 reviews. PC Gamer awarded The Sims 3 a 92% and an Editor's Choice badge, calling it "The best Sims game yet". IGN PC awarded The Sims 3 an 8.9/10, stating:

GameSpot awarded The Sims 3 a score of 9.0/10, the review praised the game: "The latest Sims game is also the greatest, striking a terrific balance between the fresh and the familiar."

The game was ranked #91 in IGN's "Top 100 Modern Games". In a special edition of Edge magazine listing their 100 top videogames of all-time, The Sims 3 was number 89 on the list.

Reviewing the Nintendo 3DS version, IGN gave it a 7.5 out of 10, stating "while some of the additions are welcome like the new graphics and interface, the removal of certain features like multiple saves, personality traits and calling for services is odd", although also stating "Still, if you’ve never played a Sims game before, prepare to be addicted. Even though this version has some problems, the positives outweigh the negatives."

References

External links 
 Official website
 
 
 

2009 video games
Android (operating system) games
Bada games
BlackBerry games
Electronic Arts games
IOS games
Life simulation games
MacOS games
N-Gage service games
Nintendo DS games
Nintendo 3DS games
Open-world video games
PlayStation 3 games
Social simulation video games
The Sims
Video game prequels
Video game sequels
Video games featuring protagonists of selectable gender
Video games scored by Steve Jablonsky
Video games with expansion packs
Video games with downloadable content
Wii games
Windows games
Windows Phone games
Xbox 360 games
Video games about ghosts
Video games with alternative versions
Video games with custom soundtrack support
Shorty Award winners
Video games developed in the United States
Single-player video games